Blissville Township is one of sixteen townships in Jefferson County, Illinois, USA.  As of the 2010 census, its population was 404 and it contained 172 housing units.

Geography
The township is centered at 38°15'N 89°5'W (38.257,-89.088).

Cities, towns, villages
 Waltonville (northwest quarter)

Unincorporated towns
 Williamsburg at 
(This list is based on USGS data and may include former settlements.)

Adjacent townships
 Casner Township (north)
 McClellan Township (east)
 Elk Prairie Township (southeast)
 Bald Hill Township (south)
 DuBois Township, Washington County (west)
 Ashley Township, Washington County (northwest)

Cemeteries
The township contains these six cemeteries: Gilbert, Knob Prairie, Minson, Mount Zion, Quinn and Taylor.

Demographics

School districts
 Waltonville Community Unit School District 1

Political districts
 Illinois's 19th congressional district
 State House District 107
 State Senate District 54

References
 
 United States Census Bureau 2007 TIGER/Line Shapefiles
 United States National Atlas

External links
 City-Data.com
 Illinois State Archives

Townships in Jefferson County, Illinois
Mount Vernon, Illinois micropolitan area
Townships in Illinois